Zachariah Ormsby (1657–1713) was an Irish Anglican priest.

Shepherd was born in Ballgrennan and educated at Trinity College, Dublin. He was Archdeacon of Ardfert from 1686 to 1693; Prebendary of Croagh in Limerick Cathedral from then until his death.

References

17th-century Irish Anglican priests
18th-century Irish Anglican priests
Clergy from County Limerick
Archdeacons of Ardfert
Diocese of Limerick, Ardfert and Aghadoe
Alumni of Trinity College Dublin
1713 deaths
1657 births